Vadym Kholodenko (born 1986, in Kyiv) is a Ukrainian pianist, and winner of the gold medal at the Fourteenth Van Cliburn International Piano Competition, who captured the attention of jury, audience, and critics alike for "mesmerizing and exhilarating" performances that brought the crowd to their feet, "[cheering] him like a rock star".

Also taking home prizes for best performance of the piano quintet and best performance of a commissioned work, Vadym highlighted the Final Round with two concerti with the Fort Worth Symphony Orchestra, conducted by Leonard Slatkin. His cadenza in Mozart's Concerto No. 21 in C Major, K. 467, which he wrote on the plane, was praised as "fascinatingly contrapuntal," showing "the guts of a true superartist."

Kholodenko performed over 50 engagements in 2013–14 as part of his debut season as Cliburn Gold Medalist, including the Bakersfield Symphony Orchestra, the Mann Center with The Philadelphia Orchestra, La Jolla Music Society, CU Presents, Cliburn Concerts, the Krannert Center for the Performing Arts, the Lied Center of Kansas, and Portland Piano International. Also part of his prize package, recording label harmonia mundi usa released a live CD of his award-winning Van Cliburn Competition performances on November 12, 2013, followed by a studio recording.

Kholodenko has worked with Yuri Bashmet, Vladimir Spivakov, Constantine Orbelian, Mark Gorenstein, Alexander Rudin, Dmitry Liss, Eugeny Bushkov, Alexander Sladkovsky, and other distinguished conductors, and has performed across the globe in Austria, China, the Czech Republic, Finland, France, Germany, Israel, Italy, Ireland, Japan, Lithuania, Poland, Romania, Russia, Switzerland, and the United States. He released recordings of Liszt, Rachmaninov, and Medtner on Russia's TV Culture label in 2009. An avid chamber musician as well, he performed and recorded a CD with violinist Alena Baeva, and formed a piano duo with Andrey Gugnin which they dubbed "iDuo." The duo has released a recording with Delos Records.

In addition to his Cliburn victory, Kholodenko has also taken first prize at the Maria Callas International Piano Competition (2004), Sendai International Music Competition (2010), and International Schubert Competition (Dortmund, 2011).

Born in Kyiv, Ukraine, Vadym Kholodenko is the first musician in his family. He made his first appearances in the United States, China, Hungary, and Croatia at the age of 13. In 2005, Kholodenko moved to Moscow to study at the Moscow P. I. Tchaikovsky Conservatory under Vera Gornostaeva.

On March 17, 2016, his two daughters were found dead and his estranged wife, Sofya Tsygankova, injured inside their Benbrook, Texas, home.  On March 21, 2016, Tsygankova was arrested and charged with the deaths of the two children.  On July 16, 2018, a judge found Tsygankova not guilty by reason of insanity, but ordered her to be committed to a psychiatric hospital. He is currently married to the Russian violinist, Alena Baeva.

Selected recordings

 Edvard Grieg, Piano concerto in A minor op.16, Camille Saint-Saëns, piano concerto n°2 in G minor, Vadym Kholodenko, piano, The Norwegian Radio Orchestra, conducted by Miguel Harth-Bedoya. CD Harmonia Mundi 2016

References

Ukrainian classical pianists
Male classical pianists
1986 births
Living people
Prize-winners of the Van Cliburn International Piano Competition
21st-century classical pianists
21st-century male musicians